St Barnabas College may refer to:
 St Barnabas College (Adelaide), Australia
 St Barnabas College (Johannesburg), South Africa
 Rodrigues College, formerly St Barnabas College, Mauritius